Metalloreductase STEAP1 is an enzyme that in humans is encoded by the STEAP1 gene.

This gene is predominantly expressed in prostate tissue, and is found to be upregulated in multiple cancer cell lines. The gene product is predicted to be a six-transmembrane protein, and was shown to be a cell surface antigen significantly expressed at cell-cell junctions.

References

Further reading